Herman Hallberg (born 22 May 1997) is a Swedish footballer who plays for Trelleborgs FF. He's the younger brother of footballer Melker Hallberg.

References

External links 
 

Swedish footballers
Allsvenskan players
Superettan players
1997 births
Living people
Kalmar FF players
Trelleborgs FF players
People from Kalmar Municipality
Association football midfielders
Sportspeople from Kalmar County